Soria Moria is a 1989 album from the Norwegian singer Sissel Kyrkjebø, named after the fairy tale Soria Moria Castle.

Track listing
Se over fjellet
Pokarekare Ana
Amazing Grace
Blod i brann
Gi meg ikke din styrke
Liliana
Soria Moria
Sommerdrøm
Seterjentens søndag
Slummens datter
Alle have består av dråper
Grenseløs
Veien er ditt mål
Somewhere

Charts

References

1989 albums
Sissel Kyrkjebø albums